Oleaster, signifying a plant like an olive, but less valuable (cf. poetaster), may be applied to:
Feral olive trees that have been allowed to run wild
Olea oleaster, the wild olive
Various species of Elaeagnus, notably Elaeagnus angustifolia, the Russian olive, the dried fruits of which are eaten during Nowruz